"1000 Stars" is a song recorded by Australian singer and actress Natalie Bassingthwaighte. It was written by Chris Braide, Hattie Webb and Charlie Webb. "1000 Stars" was released on 23 April 2009 as the third single from Bassingthwaighte's debut solo album of the same name. Bassingthwaighte stated that the song is "all about that moment of falling in love, that moment of perfection". Upon its release, "1000 Stars" peaked at number 30 on the ARIA Singles Chart.

Background and release
"1000 Stars" was written by Chris Braide, Hattie Webb and Charlie Webb for Natalie Bassingthwaighte's debut solo album of the same name. It was recorded live at Untouchable Sound Studios in London. Bassingthwaighte stated that the song is "all about that moment of falling in love, that moment of perfection". She then went on to say, "I remember going into the studio and singing it from it the beginning to end over and over again. I haven't sung like that since my musical theatre days. That's me there, no bells and whistles, no sound effects; it was me in the purest form just having a good sing."

"1000 Stars" was sent to Australian radio stations on 27 March 2009. It was then released as a digital extended play (EP) on 23 April 2009, which included the bonus tracks "Happiness" and "Supersensual". The EP was later released as a CD on 1 May 2009. "1000 Stars" debuted and peaked at number 30 on the ARIA Singles Chart on 11 May 2009. In its second, third and fourth weeks, the song dropped to numbers 31, 36 and 43, respectively.

Promotion and cover versions
The music video for "1000 Stars" was directed by Gemma Lee and released onto Bassingthwaighte's official YouTube channel on 20 April 2009. Bassingthwaighte performed the song at the 51st TV Week Logie Awards on 3 May 2009.

The Webb Sisters, who co-wrote "1000 Stars" with Chris Braide, released their own version of the song on their 2009 EP The Other Side. It was later included on their third studio album Savages, released in 2010.

Track listing
CD single / Digital EP
 "1000 Stars" (Single Edit) – 3:59
 "Happiness" – 3:13
 "Supersensual" (Denzel Park Remix) – 6:39
 "1000 Stars" – 4:00

Credits and personnel
Credits adapted from the liner notes of 1000 Stars.

Locations
Recorded at Untouchable Sound Studios in London.
Mixed at Air Studios.
Mastered at Sterling Sound in New York City.

Personnel
Songwriting – Chris Braide, Hattie Webb, Charlie Webb
Production – Chris Braide
Pro-Tools editing – Ben Wood
Drums recording – Ben Wood
All instruments (except drums) – Chris Braide
Drums – Cameron McGlinchey
Mixing – Adam Noble
All vocals – Natalie Bassingthwaighte
Mastering – Leon Zervos

Charts

Weekly charts

Year-end charts

Release history

References 

2009 songs
2009 singles
Natalie Bassingthwaighte songs
Songs written by Chris Braide
Song recordings produced by Chris Braide
Sony Music Australia singles